"If You Ever Have Forever in Mind" is a song co-written and recorded by American country music artist Vince Gill.  It was released in May 1998 as the first single from the album The Key.  The song reached number 5 on the Billboard Hot Country Singles & Tracks chart and number 1 in Canada. It also won Gill the Grammy Award for Best Male Country Vocal Performance.  It was written by Gill and Troy Seals.

Critical reception
Chuck Taylor, of Billboard magazine reviewed the song favorably saying that "there's a classy vintage sound to this soft ballad." He goes on to say that the "delicate piano and whispery percussion underscore Gill's silky vocal performance."

Music video
The music video was directed by Jim Shea and premiered in early 1998.

Chart performance
"If You Ever Have Forever in Mind" debuted at number 61 on the U.S. Billboard Hot Country Singles & Tracks for the week of May 30, 1998.

Year-end charts

References

1998 singles
1998 songs
Vince Gill songs
Songs written by Troy Seals
Songs written by Vince Gill
Song recordings produced by Tony Brown (record producer)
MCA Nashville Records singles
Grammy Award for Best Male Country Vocal Performance winners